This is a partial list of places in Preston, Lancashire. As well as the urban settlement of Preston, it also includes places within the larger City of Preston local government district.

Council wards

Suburbs

 Ashton-on-Ribble
 Fulwood
 Ingol
 Lea
 Ribbleton

Estates/Localities
 Adelphi
 Avenham
 Broadgate
 Brookfield
 Cadley
 Callon
 Deepdale
 Farringdon Park
 Fishwick
 Frenchwood
 Grange
 Greenlands
 Holme Slack
 Lane Ends
 Larches
 Longsands
 Maudlands
 Moor Nook
 Plungington
 Savick
 Sharoe Green
 Sherwood
 Tanterton
 Wychnor

Villages
 Barton
 Broughton
 Cottam
 Goosnargh
 Grimsargh
 Haighton
 Inglewhite
 Whitechapel
 Woodplumpton

Civil parishes

Barton
Broughton
Goosnargh
Grimsargh
Haighton
Ingol and Tanterton (neighbourhood, since 2012)
Lea
Whittingham
Woodplumpton

Rivers, brooks and water features
 River Brock (bordering)
 Lancaster Canal
 River Loud (bordering)
 River Ribble (bordering)
 Ribble Link

Footpaths and cycle routes
The Preston Guild Wheel is a cycle route which orbits the city with 'spokes' joining the city centre to the wheel. The council opened the route in time for the city's 2012 Guild celebrations.

Woods
 Asda Wood, Fulwood
 Beacon Fell Country Park, Goosnargh
 Brockholes Wood, Ribbleton
 Clough Copse, Fulwood
 Fernyhalgh Wood, Fulwood
 Fishwick Local Nature Reserve Acc, Fishwick
 Fishwick Local Nature Reserve Site, Fishwick
 Grange Valley Open Space, Ribbleton
 Masons Wood, Fulwood
 Midgery Wood, Fulwood
 Moss Leach Wood, Fulwood
 Preston Guild Wheel, Ribbleton
 Preston Guild Wheel, Riversway
 Preston Guild Wheel, Savick
 Sandybrook Woods, Fulwood
 Tom Benson Walk, Tanterton
 Turnbrook Woods. Grimsargh

Parks

 Ashton Park
 Avenham Park
 Haslam Park
 Miller Park
 Moor Park
 Ribbleton Park (formerly known as Waverley Park)

Notable buildings

 Chingle Hall
 Harris Museum
 Preston bus station
 Preston railway station

Miscellaneous
 Ladyewell

Areas outside of the Preston City Council boundaries

Preston's city centre is on the city's southern border with the South Ribble borough. This means that some of the areas and towns in Preston Urban Area and PRESTON post town are not within the area administered by Preston City Council.

References

City of Preston, Lancashire
 
Places In Preston